NETFILE is a transmission service that allows eligible Canadians to submit their personal income tax return to the Canada Revenue Agency using the Internet.  Tax returns filed via NETFILE must first be prepared using a NETFILE-certified product.  The software or Web application produces a .tax file, which must then be uploaded to the CRA independently to constitute a tax filing. NETFILE was introduced in 2001.

According to CRA, 26% of total 2014 tax returns were sent by Netfile.  To Netfile taxes, users need a certified tax program, which is listed on the CRA website.

Advantages 
According to the CRA website:

 It is secure and confidential.
 File your returns directly from one of the NETFILE-certified products available using the NETFILE webservice.
 Refunds are issued faster (in most cases, with direct deposit, you can receive your refund in as little as eight business days).
 It is more accurate (because the CRA doesn't re-key the information, there is less chance of errors).
 You don't have to mail a paper return.
 You don't have to send in receipts, unless the CRA asks for them at a later date.
 You get immediate confirmation that the CRA has received your tax return.

Disadvantages 

 You cannot change your address when you file your return using NETFILE.
 Payments sent to CRA will be processed faster.
 You are unable to ensure exactly what information was sent from your computer.
 You require an internet connection.
 You are required to use NETFILE certified tax software

See also 
 Canadian efile, a similar service used by professional tax preparers.

References

External links
 Canada Revenue Agency/Agence du revenue du Canada
 Certified Software for the 2014 NETFILE Program
 E-services/Services électroniques.gc.ca
 My Business Account/Mon dossier d'entreprise.gc.ca
 Netfile.gc.ca

2001 establishments in Canada
Taxation in Canada